Estonian Academy of Security Sciences is a public vocational university in Estonia. It provides professional education for Estonian civil servants under the Estonian Ministry of the Interior. Its objective is to ensure a secure state and stable development, and to contribute to the security of the European Union. It was established on 15 April 1992 and is based in Tallinn. It has facilities in Pärnu County, Väike-Maarja Parish, Narva and Meriküla.

History
The academy was founded on 15 April 1992, by the Estonian Government. Studies began on October 12. There were courses for police, investigation, customs, border guard and defence forces cadets. In 1993, the school was renamed the Estonian National Defence Academy. In 1999, teaching of defence force officers was transferred to the Estonian Military Academy. In 2004, Väike-Maarja Rescue School and Paikuse Police School were joined to the academy, and in 2006, Muraste Border Guard School also joined the academy. In 2010, due to the formation of the joint Police and Border Guard Board, the academy was reformed, combining the police college and border guard college. In addition, the Institute of Internal Security was formed. In 2015, migration studies were transferred to Tallinn University.

Structure
The highest decision-making body of the academy is the council. The council consists of the rector, vice-rectors, directors, the head of the institute, and representatives of the academic staff, student body, and the Ministry of the Interior. The head of the council is the rector. There is also an Advisory Body, which makes proposals on the development of the academy to the rector, council and the Ministry of the Interior. The rector is also advised by the rectorate, which consists of vice-rectors and directors of colleges. The academy consists of colleges, institutes and centres. There are four colleges and one institute: Financial College, College of Justice, Police and Border Guard College, Rescue College, and Institute of Internal Security. Centres are led by vice-rectors. The Vice Rector of Academic Affairs governs the Language Centre, Centre for Continuing Education and Department of Affairs. The Vice Rector of Development governs the Department of IR and Development and the library. In addition, there are various administrative departments, like the Department of Administration, Financial Department, General Department, and Department of Communication.

Notable faculty
Urmas Reinsalu (born 1975), Estonian politician

See also
List of universities in Estonia
Police and Border Guard Board
Estonian Rescue Board
Estonian Internal Security Service
IT and Development Centre. Ministry of the Interior, Estonia

References

External links

Universities and colleges in Estonia
Educational institutions established in 1992
Law enforcement in Estonia
1992 establishments in Estonia
Education in Tallinn
Military education and training in Estonia